Price was an electoral district of the House of Assembly in the Australian state of South Australia from 1970 to 2002. Based in the north-west of Adelaide, it was a safe Labor seat.

Price was left as the only safe Labor seat at the 1993 election landslide.

The district was renamed Cheltenham at the 2002 election.

Members for Price

Election results

References

External links
1985 & 1989 election boundaries, page 18 & 19

Former electoral districts of South Australia
1985 establishments in Australia
2002 disestablishments in Australia